Lothar Kettenacker (born 1939) is a historian of Germany in the twentieth century. He is a former research fellow and deputy director of the German Historical Institute London.

Selected publications 
 Nationalsozialistische Volkstumspolitik im Elsaß. Deutsche Verlagsanstalt, 1973.
 (Hrsg.): Das “Andere Deutschland” im Zweiten Weltkrieg. Emigration und Widerstand in internationaler Perspektive. Klett, Stuttgart 1977.
 mit Wolfgang J. Mommsen (Hrsg.): The Fascist Challenge and the Policy of Appeasement. Allen & Unwin, 1983.
 Krieg zur Friedenssicherung. Die Deutschlandplanung der britischen Regierung während des Zweiten Weltkrieges. Vandenhoeck & Ruprecht, Göttingen 1989.
 mit Günther Heydemann (Hrsg.): Kirchen in der Diktatur. Drittes Reich und SED-Staat. Fünfzehn Beiträge. Vandenhoeck & Ruprecht, Göttingen 1993.
 Germany Since 1945. Oxford University Press, Oxford 1997.
 (Hrsg.): Ein Volk von Opfern? Die neue Debatte um den Bombenkrieg 1940–45. Rowohlt, 2003.
 Germany 1989: In the Aftermath of the Cold War. Longman, 2009.
 mit Torsten Riotte (Hrsg.): The Legacies of Two World Wars. European Societies in The Twentieth Century. Berghahn Books, 2011.

References 

1939 births
Living people
Historians of Germany
20th-century German historians
Alumni of the University of Oxford
Academics of the German Historical Institute London
21st-century German historians